The 2017 FIVB Volleyball Girls' U18 World Championship was the fifteenth edition of the international volleyball tournament and the world championship for women's national teams under the age of 18, organized by the sport's world governing body, FIVB. The tournament was hosted by Argentina in the cities of Rosario and Santa Fe from 18 to 27 August 2017. 20 teams from the 5 confederations competed in the tournament.

Italy won its second title in the competition, after also winning the previous edition, defeating Dominican Republic in the final. Russia defeated Turkey for the bronze medal. Elena Pietrini from Italy was elected the MVP.

Qualification
The FIVB Sports Events Council revealed a proposal to streamline the number of teams participating in the Age Group World Championships.

Pools composition

The drawing of lots was held in Rosario, Argentina on 10 May 2017. Argentina as a host country team were seeded in the top position of pool A, And the top seven teams from World ranking as per January 2017 were seed in serpentine system in first two rows. the twelve remaining teams were drawn in next three rows under the condition that there were not too much country in the same confederation were drawn in the same pool. Numbers in brackets denote the World ranking.

Squads

Venues

Referees

AVC (4)
 Carla Hoorweg
 Wang Ziling
 Kang Joo-Hee
 Maissaa Hachem

CAVB (2)
 Marthe Clémence Eyike
 Waleed El Kheshen

CEV (5)
 Olivier Guillet
 Sonja Simonovska
 Sokol Katarzyna
 Kozlova Nadezhda
 Mykhaylo Medvid

CSV (5)
 Concia Pedro Fabia
 Silvio Silveira
 Jorge Ernesto Erazo Maldonado
 Rocio Aida Huarcaya Lopez
 Denis Fabián Carbajal Mozzo

NORCECA (4)
 Lourdes Perez Perez
 Daniel Gonzalez
 Brian Charles
 Patricia Rolf

Pool standing procedure
 Number of matches won
 Match points
 Sets ratio
 Points ratio
 If the tie continues as per the point ratio between two teams, the priority will be given to the team which won the last match between them. When the tie in points ratio is between three or more teams, a new classification of these teams in the terms of points 1, 2 and 3 will be made taking into consideration only the matches in which they were opposed to each other.
Match won 3–0 or 3–1: 3 match points for the winner, 0 match points for the loser
Match won 3–2: 2 match points for the winner, 1 match point for the loser

Preliminary round
All times are Argentina Standard Time (UTC−03:00).

Pool A

|}

|}

Pool B

|}

|}

Pool C

|}

|}

Pool D

|}

|}

Final round
All times are Argentina Standard Time (UTC−03:00).

Championship bracket

Round of 16

|}

Quarterfinals

|}

Semifinals

|}

3rd place match

|}

Final

|}

5th–8th places

5th–8th semifinals

|}

7th place match

|}

5th place match

|}

9th–16th places

9th–16th quarterfinals

|}

13th–16th semifinals

|}

9th–12th semifinals

|}

15th place match

|}

13th place match

|}

11th place match

|}

9th place match

|}

17th–20th places

|}

|}

Final standing

Awards

Most Valuable Player
  Elena Pietrini
Best Setter
  Rachele Morello
Best Outside Spikers
  Madeline Guillen
  Ebrar Karakurt

Best Middle Blockers
  Victoriia Pushina
  Sarah Fahr
Best Opposite Spiker
  Terry Enweonwu
Best Libero
  Yaneirys Rodríguez

See also
2017 FIVB Volleyball Boys' U19 World Championship

References

External links
Official website

FIVB Volleyball Girls' U18 World Championship
FIVB Volleyball Girls' U18 World Championship
International volleyball competitions hosted by Argentina
2017 in Argentine sport
August 2017 sports events in South America